The following television stations broadcast on digital or analog channel 5 in Canada:

 CFCN-TV-4 in Burmis, Alberta
 CFCN-TV-9 in Cranbrook, British Columbia
 CFJC-TV-6 in 100 Mile House, British Columbia
 CHAU-DT in Carleton, Quebec
 CHRO-TV in Pembroke, Ontario
 CICI-TV in Sudbury, Ontario
 CIHC-TV in Hay River, Northwest Territories
 CJDC-TV in Dawson Creek, British Columbia
 CKCW-TV-2 in St. Edward, Prince Edward Island
 CKTN-TV-1 in Castlegar, British Columbia
 CKVU-TV-1 in Courtenay, British Columbia

The following television stations, which are no longer licensed, formerly broadcast on channel 5 in Canada:

 CKBI-TV in Prince Albert, Saskatchewan

References

05 TV stations in Canada